Goephanes luctuosus is a species of beetle in the family Cerambycidae which is native to Madagascar. It was described by Pascoe in 1862.  A public domain drawing can be viewed in the Google books scan of the 1862 edition of the Journal of Entomology.

References

Goephanes
Beetles described in 1862
Taxa named by Francis Polkinghorne Pascoe